Amphisbaena bahiana is a species of worm lizards found in Brazil.

References

bahiana
Reptiles described in 1964
Endemic fauna of Brazil
Reptiles of Brazil
Taxa named by Paulo Vanzolini